The Timex Sinclair 1000 (or T/S 1000) was the first computer produced by Timex Sinclair, a joint venture between Timex Corporation and Sinclair Research. It was launched in July 1982, with a US sales price of US$99.95, making it the cheapest home computer at the time; it was advertised as "the first computer under $100". The computer was aimed at regular home users. As purchased, the T/S 1000 was fully assembled and ready to be plugged into home televisions, which served as a video monitor. The T/S 1000 was a slightly modified version of the Sinclair ZX81 with an NTSC RF modulator, for use with North American TVs, instead of PAL for European TVs. The T/S 1000 doubled the onboard RAM from 1 KB to 2 KB; further expandable by 16 KB through the cartridge port. The T/S 1000's casing had slightly more internal shielding but remained the same as Sinclair's, including the membrane keyboard. Just like the ZX81, the T/S 1000 had black-and-white graphics and no sound.

It was followed in 1983 by an improved version, the Timex Sinclair 1500 which incorporated the 16 KB RAM expansion and featured a lower price (US$80). However, the T/S 1500 did not achieve market success, given that by this time the marketplace was dominated by Commodore, Radio Shack, Atari and Apple.

History

Timex claimed to have sold 600,000 T/S 1000s in the US by early 1983, and other companies imported localized versions of British software. It sold for US$99.95 in the US when it debuted, making it the cheapest home computer at the time; it was advertised as "the first computer under $100". This pricing initiated a price war with Commodore International, who quickly reduced the price of its VIC-20 to match and later announced a trade-in program offering $100 for any competing computer toward the purchase of a Commodore 64. Since the T/S 1000 was selling for $49 by this time, many customers bought them for the sole purpose of trading them in for a Commodore 64.

Like the Sinclair ZX81, the T/S 1000 used 8K BASIC, a version of Sinclair BASIC (a BASIC dialect), as its primary interface and programming language.  To make the membrane keyboard less cumbersome for program entry, the T/S 1000 used a shortcut system of one-letter "keywords" for most commands (e.g., pressing  while the cursor was in "keyword mode" would generate the keyword PRINT). Some keywords required a short sequence of keystrokes (e.g., + would generate the keyword LPRINT). One notable thing about this version of BASIC was that, unlike other versions where it's optional in a program, the LET command was used extensively for data.

The T/S 1000 was normally plugged into a regular TV that served as a computer monitor. The computer produced a black-and-white display that consisted of 32 columns and 24 lines. Of those lines, 22 were accessible for display, with two reserved for data entry and error messages. The limited graphics were based on geometric shapes contained within the operating system's non-ASCII character set. The only form of long-term storage was Compact Cassette. The 16 KB memory expansion module sold for $49.95. A shortage of the memory expansion modules coupled with a lack of software that would run within 2 KB meant that the system had little use for anything other than as an introduction to programming. Home computer magazines of the era such as Compute! showed enthusiasts how to interface the computer with various kinds of equipment. These tutorials provided an opportunity for learning about early speech synthesis technology through a Speak & Spell, robotics control through the memory port, and scrolling text displays for advertising.

Over time, the T/S 1000 spawned a cottage industry of third-party add-ons designed to help remedy its limitations and provide more functions. Full-size keyboards, speech synthesizers, sound generators, disk drives, and memory expansions (up to 64 KB) were a few of the options available. Languages such as Forth and Pascal, as well as BASIC compilers and assemblers, augmented the T/S 1000's programming possibilities. Computer enthusiast magazines from the early 1980s included articles that contained the programming instructions for simple games and other programs that could be used with the device. Microcomputing magazine published an article in April 1983, criticizing the membrane keyboard ("The designers of the Timex-Sinclair 1000 ... reduced this important programming tool to a fraction of the required size") and describing how to connect external full-size keyboards.

Peripherals
Timex Computer Corporation produced a cartridge interface for the T/S 1000, the Timex Sinclair 1510 Command Cartridge Player. Only four cartridge titles were ever released:

 07-9001 Supermath
 07-9002 States and Capitals
 07-9003 Chess
 07-9004 Flight Simulator (Required the 16K RAM pack) The program took 12 minutes to load.

The TS1510 can be used with a T/S 1000 and a 16 KB RAM pack (an additional RAM pack). Users could also load programs using a tape recorder and compact cassettes.

Timex released a thermal printer for use with the T/S 1000.  The printer retailed for $100.00.

Timex Sinclair 1500 

The T/S 1500 was an upgraded T/S 1000 with a better keyboard and 16 KB RAM, introduced in 1983. Timex Sinclair (TMX Portugal) designed the T/S 1500 and offered it to the Timex Corporation. The design utilized the T/S 2000 prototype (ZX Spectrum-like) silver cases that weren't previously used because of the launch of the T/S 2068. The machine was sold in the United States, Canada and Portugal.

The T/S 1500 replaced the earlier machine's ZX81-like case with a silver ZX Spectrum-like case, the same ZX Spectrum rubber keyboard, and a custom ULA. The T/S 1500 did not incorporate the Ferranti ULA. The T/S 1500 used a standard television for its display, "broadcasting" on either channel 2 or 3. It defaulted to TV channel 2, but if  was pressed on the keyboard within a few seconds of turning the computer on, it changed to channel 3 instead. Although the T/S 1500 came with 16 KB internal RAM, an external 16 KB RAM pack could be added for a total of 32 KB RAM. A few keyboard commands (POKEs) were required for the system to recognize the additional memory space (the RAM pack is multiplexed to the start of the RAM).

The T/S 1500 sold for $80 and was not a commercial success because of its late launch long after the success of the T/S 1000. The T/S 1000's successor, the T/S 2068, was already available, and the home computer market in general was dominated by Commodore, Radio Shack, Atari and Apple.

Bugs
There are two little-known software differences between the T/S 1000 and T/S 1500.

On the T/S 1000 and ZX81, the command:

 LPRINT 0.00001

results in the Timex printer outputting 0.0XYZ1. This well-known fault was corrected on the T/S 1500.

The T/S 1000 runs the following loop correctly, but the T/S 1500 does not; it makes one fewer iteration than it should.
10 FOR I=0 TO 1 STEP 0.25
20 PRINT I
30 NEXT I

References

External links

 1982: Timex Sinclair Computer
 Timex Sinclair 1000
 Suitcase version of Timex Sinclair 1500
 Timex Computer World-Timex Sinclair 1500
 Timex Computer World-Timex Sinclair 1510
 Timex Computer World – Pictures of Timex Sinclair 1500
 Timex Computer World – Pictures of Timex Sinclair 1510
 Historycorner.de – German Site for the Timex Sinclair 1000

Sinclair Research
Computer-related introductions in 1982
Timex Group
Z80-based home computers
Home computers
Sinclair ZX81 clones